The English Coonhound, also referred to as the American English Coonhound (by the American Kennel Club only) or the Redtick Coonhound, is a breed of coonhound that originated in and is typically bred in the Southern United States. It is descended from hunting hounds, especially foxhounds, brought to America by settlers during the 17th and 18th centuries. The breed's first recognition came from the United Kennel Club in 1905 as the English Fox and Coonhound. Further recognition has been granted in recent years by the American Kennel Club, first in the Foundation Stock Service and in 2011 as a fully recognized member of the hound group.

The breed is of medium height and proportionate weight, and their coats come predominantly in three types: redtick, bluetick, and a tricolor tick pattern. The English Coonhound has a high prey drive and, while it is typically used in 'coon hunting', it is also skilled in treeing. This breed is generally a healthy one, but it is recommended that prospective owners learn to recognize symptoms of bloat, as its large size and deep chest put them at risk of this condition.

History
The breed's ancestry can be traced back to foxhounds brought to the United States by European settlers during the 17th and 18th centuries. It shares a common ancestry with all other coonhounds, with the exception of the Plott Hound. The breed developed from 'Virginia Hounds', which were developed over time from dogs imported to the United States by Robert Brooke, Thomas Walker and the first President of the United States, George Washington. The terrain here was much rougher than what they were used to, so the breed was specifically bred over time to better adapt to these new conditions. It was traditionally used to hunt raccoons by night and the American red fox by day. The United Kennel Club (UKC) first recognized it in 1905 as the English Fox and Coonhound.

The Treeing Walker Coonhound was recognized separately by the UKC in 1945, separating it from the English Fox and Coonhound breed. The following year, the Bluetick Coonhound was also split into an entirely different breed.

The English Coonhound was accepted into the American Kennel Club's Foundation Stock Service as the American English Coonhound in 1995. On 1 January, 2010, it was moved up to the Miscellaneous Class. Following the recognition of the breed by the AKC in the hound group on 30 June 2011 as the 171st breed, the American English Coonhound became eligible to compete in the National Dog Show in 2011, followed by its eligibility for the Westminster Kennel Club Dog Show and the AKC National Championship for the first time in 2012.

Description

The weight of a Coonhound should be in proportion to the dog's height.

Unlike the other breeds of coonhounds, a variety of colorations is acceptable to meet English Coonhound breed standards. Coloration can be redtick, bluetick, tricolored and tricolored with ticking. However, red markings are predominant and "Redtick" is a common term for English Coonhounds. Some believe this lack of emphasis on specific coloration has allowed breeders to focus breeding programs on traits such as intelligence and hunting ability rather than appearance and coat standards. Color variations are common even among pups from the same litter of English Coonhounds, indicating high levels of DNA diversity in the breed. The coat is short and coarse.

Temperament
English Coonhounds require regular exercise to keep in prime condition, but are generally mellow when not on the prey's tail. English Coonhounds usually make good house pets. However, they have a high prey drive and will go after small animals unless time is taken to train them otherwise. Because of this, they are not usually recommended for households with small pets unless they have been raised around small animals. They are generally good with children and tend to be very loyal dogs that are eager to please their owners. Like most puppies, younger English Coonhounds can be quite inquisitive and destructive; therefore, obedience training early on is highly recommended, as is providing them with plenty of attention and exercise. As they are known to bark when caged, crate training from a young age is strongly recommended, as well.

Like all coonhounds, English Coonhounds are generally good-natured and very sociable dogs. Skittishness or aggression is considered a defect, according to UKC breed standards. They are strong-willed, if not downright stubborn, and require more patience in training than other breeds. English Coonhounds are incessant nesters and should be avoided by people who do not wish to have dogs on their furniture. They make excellent family pets, as they have been bred to coexist amiably within a pack, as well as to be efficient hunters. English Coonhounds also make adequate watch dogs, as their vocalizations are characterized by melodious, drawn-out bawls and short, explosive chops typical of hound-type dogs.

Hunting
The breed has proven popular with coon hunters and has a powerful nose which enables it to track both small and large game, including raccoons, cougars and bears. One of the types of hunting that the breed is used for is treeing, where the dogs are used to force climbing animals up into trees, where they can be cornered and shot by hunters.

While known for their ability in this type of hunting, they can lose their ability to pace themselves and, on occasion, stand their ground when they believe that they have chased their prey up a tree, even if they have not. They can have a one-track mind while hunting and tune everything else out, including commands. Against cougars and bears, they can keep the larger game in position until the hunters arrive. They have become a favored breed in coon hunting.

Health
English Coonhounds can be prone to overheating while on coon hunts during the summer months in the Southern United States. Breeders who specialize in this breed screen their potential pairs for hip and elbow dysplasia, as well as any eye disorders. Like any other floppy-eared dog breed, the English Coonhound should have its ears checked frequently to ensure minimal wax and debris buildup. Owners should also learn the symptoms of bloat, as their large size and deep chest makes them susceptible to this sometimes life-threatening disease.

See also
 Dogs portal
 List of dog breeds

References

External links

Scent hounds
Dog breeds originating in the United States
Rare dog breeds